Carolyn Rossi Copeland is a theater producer and founder of The Lamb's Theatre located in the Times Square New York City area. She served as Vice President of Creative Affairs for Radio City Entertainment and Madison Square Garden Productions, where she oversaw the historic remount of The Scarlet Pimpernel on Broadway and new projects for The Radio City Rockettes. She served as Creative Consultant for The Gaylord Group. She is the executive producer of Strouse IP, managing the music and show catalogue of the Tony Award winner Charles Strouse.

She received her B.A. in Political Science from Newcomb College in New Orleans, Louisiana, in 1976.

Shows 
 The Gift of the Magi (Off-Off-Broadway, 1986) Director
 Godspell (Off-Broadway, 1988) Producing Director
 The Gift of the Magi (Off-Broadway, 1988) Producing Director
 The Revelation of John (Off-Broadway, 1989) Producing Director
 Smoke on the Mountain (Off-Broadway, 1990) Producer
 Opal (Off-Broadway, 1992) Producing Director
 Johnny Pye and the Foolkiller (Off-Broadway, 1993) Producing Artistic Director
 john & jen (Off-Broadway, 1995) Producer
 Smoke on the Mountain (Off-Broadway, 1998) Producer
 The Prince and the Pauper (Off-Broadway, 2002) Producer
 The Gospel of John (Off-Broadway, 2003) Producer
 Silent Laughter (Off-Broadway, 2004) Producer
 Children's Letters to God (Off-Broadway, 2004) Producer
 The God Committee (Off-Broadway, 2006) Producer
 Flamingo Court (Off-Broadway, 2008) Executive Producer
 Flamingo Court (Off-Broadway, 2009) Producer
 Freud's Last Session (Off-Broadway, 2010) Producer
 Freud's Last Session (Off-Broadway, 2011) Producer
 Amazing Grace (Chicago, 2014) Producer
 Amazing Grace (Broadway, 2015) Executive Producer
 Indian Joe (Goodspeed, 2015) Executive Producer

References

External links 
 CRC Productions
 

Living people
1954 births
American theatre managers and producers
Tulane University alumni